Dunksburg is an unincorporated community in Johnson and Pettis counties, in the U.S. state of Missouri.

History
Dunksburg was originally called Dunkley's Store, and under the latter name was founded in 1858, and named after B. F. Dunkley, a local merchant. A post office called Dunksburg was established in 1890, and remained in operation until 1904.

References

Unincorporated communities in Johnson County, Missouri
Unincorporated communities in Pettis County, Missouri
Unincorporated communities in Missouri